This is a list of wars involving the Ottoman Empire ordered chronologically, including civil wars within the empire.

The earliest form of the Ottoman military was a nomadic steppe cavalry force. This was centralized by Osman I from Turkoman tribesmen inhabiting western Anatolia in the late 13th century. Orhan I organized a standing army paid by salary rather than looting or fiefs. The Ottomans began using guns in the late 14th century.

The Ottoman Empire was the first of the three Islamic Gunpowder Empires, followed by Safavid Persia and Mughal India. By the 14th century, the Ottomans had adopted gunpowder artillery. By the time of Sultan Mehmed II, they had been drilled with firearms and became "perhaps the first standing infantry force equipped with firearms in the world." The Janissaries are thus considered the first modern standing army.

The Ottoman Classical Army was the military structure established by Mehmed II. The classical Ottoman army was the most disciplined and feared military force of its time, mainly due to its high level of organization, logistical capabilities and its elite troops. Following a century long reform efforts, this army was forced to disbandment by Sultan Mahmud II on 15 June 1826 by what is known as Auspicious Incident. By the reign of Mahmud the Second, the elite Janissaries had become corrupt and an obstacle in the way of modernization efforts, meaning they were more of a liability than an asset.

Rise (1299–1453)

Classical Age (1453–1566)

Transformation (1566–1703)
1568–1918 Russo-Turkish Wars
1568–1570 Russo-Turkish War
1570–1572 Russo-Crimean War
1570–1573 Ottoman–Venetian War
1571 Battle of Lepanto
1574 Conquest of Tunis (1574)
1576 Moroccan Civil War
1578 Moroccan–Portuguese War
1578 Caucasian Campaign
1578–1590 Ottoman–Safavid War
1586–1589 Ottoman–Portuguese War
1585 Ottoman–Druze War
1589 Beylerbeyi Event
1590–1610 Celali rebellions
1593–1606 Long War
1593–1617 Moldavian Magnate Wars
1594 Uprising in Banat
1596–1597 Serb uprising of 1596–1597
1598 First Tarnovo Uprising
1603–1612 Ottoman–Safavid War
1611 Epirus Revolt of 1611
1611–1613 Ottoman–Druze War
1615–1618 Ottoman–Safavid War
1620–1621 Polish–Ottoman War
1622–1628 Abaza rebellion
1623–1639 Ottoman–Safavid War
1631–1635 Ottoman–Druze War
1633–1634 Polish–Ottoman War
1645–1669 Cretan War
1648 Atmeydanı Incident
1656 Çınar Incident
1658–1667 Druze power struggle
1663–1664 Austro-Turkish War
1666–1671 Polish–Cossack–Tatar War
1672–1676 Polish–Ottoman War
1676–1681 Russo-Turkish War
1683–1699 Great Turkish War
1686 Second Tarnovo Uprising
1688 Chiprovtsi Uprising
1689 Karposh's Rebellion
1700–1721 Great Northern War

Old Regime (1703–1789)
1703 1703 Edirne Incident
1703 Invasion of Georgia
1710–1711 Russo-Turkish War
1713 Skirmish at Bender
1714–1718 Ottoman–Venetian War
1716–1718 Austro-Turkish War
1722-1730 Syunik rebellion
1726–1727 Ottoman–Hotaki War
1730 Patrona Halil
1730–1735 Ottoman–Safavid War
1732 Spanish reconquest of Oran
1735–1739 Russo-Turkish War
1737–1739 Austro-Turkish War
1743–1746 Ottoman–Afsharid War
1768–1774 Russo-Turkish War
1769–1772 Danish–Algerian War
1770 Orlov Revolt
1770 Invasion of Mani (1770)
1773–1775 Pugachev's Rebellion
1775–1776 Ottoman–Zand War
1787–1791 Austro-Turkish War
1787–1792 Russo-Turkish War

Decline and modernization (1789–1908)
1792–1802 French Revolutionary Wars
1793–1795 Tripolitanian civil war
1798–1801 French campaign in Egypt and Syria
1798–1802 War of the Second Coalition
1801–1805 First Barbary War
1803–1815 Napoleonic Wars
 1806–1812 Russo-Turkish War
 1807–1809 Anglo-Turkish War
1803 Souliote War
1803 Invasion of Mani (1803)
1803–1807 Rise of Muhammad Ali
1804–1817 Serbian–Ottoman Wars
1804–1813 First Serbian Uprising
1806 1806 Edirne Incident
1807 Invasion of Mani (1807)
1807–1808 Ottoman coups of 1807–08
1811–1818 Ottoman–Saudi War
1815 Invasion of Mani (1815)
1815 Second Barbary War
1815–1817 Second Serbian Uprising
1821–1832 Greek War of Independence
1821 Wallachian Revolution of 1821
1821–1823 Ottoman–Qajar War
1828–1829 Russo-Turkish War
1829–1830 Revolt of Atçalı Kel Mehmet
1830–1903 French conquest of Algeria
1831–1832 Great Bosnian uprising
1831–1833 Egyptian–Ottoman War
1833–1839 Albanian Revolts of 1833–39
1834 1834 Arab revolt in Palestine
1835–1858 Libyan revolt
1838 1838 Druze revolt
1839–1841 Egyptian–Ottoman War
1841 Cretan Revolt (1841)
1843–1844 Albanian Revolt of 1843–44
1847 Albanian Revolt of 1847
1848 Wallachian Revolution of 1848
1852–1878 Serbian–Ottoman Wars
1852–1862 Herzegovina Uprising (1852–1862)
1852–1853 Montenegrin–Ottoman War (1852–53)
1853–1856 Crimean War
1854 Epirus Revolt of 1854
1854 Macedonian Revolution of 1854
1858 Battle of Grahovac
1858 Cretan Revolt (1858)
1860 Lebanon conflict
1861–1862 Montenegrin–Ottoman War (1861–62)
1862 Zeitun Rebellion (1862)
1866–1869 Cretan Revolt (1866–69)
1875–1877 Herzegovina Uprising (1875–1877)
1876 April Uprising
1876 Razlovtsi insurrection
1876–1878 Montenegrin–Ottoman War (1876–78)
1876–1877 First Serbian–Ottoman War
1877–1878 Russo-Turkish War
1877–1878 Second Serbian–Ottoman War
1878 Kumanovo uprising
1878 Epirus Revolt of 1878
1878 Macedonian Revolution of 1878
1878 Cretan Revolt (1878)
1878 Austro-Hungarian occupation of Bosnia and Herzegovina
1878–1879 Kresna–Razlog Uprising
1892–1893 Ottoman–Qatari War
1893–1908 Macedonian Struggle
1894 Sasun rebellion
1895–1896 Zeitun Rebellion (1895–96)
1896–1897 Macedonian Revolution of 1896–1897
1897 Greco-Turkish War of 1897
1897-1898 Cretan Revolt (1897–1898)
1903 Theriso revolt
1903 Ilinden–Preobrazhenie Uprising
1904 Sasun Uprising
1905 Shoubak revolt
1906 Ottoman–Qajar War

Dissolution (1908–1922)
1908 Young Turk Revolution
1909 31 March Incident
1909–1910 Hauran Druze Rebellion
1910 Albanian Revolt of 1910
1910 Karak revolt
1911 Albanian Revolt of 1911
1911–1912 Italo-Turkish War
1912 Albanian Revolt of 1912
1912–1918 Serbian–Ottoman Wars
1912–1913 First Balkan War
1913 Raid on the Sublime Porte
1913 Second Balkan War
1914–1918 World War I
1917–1923 Russian Civil War
1918–1920 Armenian–Azerbaijani War
1919–1923 Turkish War of Independence

See also
 List of wars involving Turkey
 List of battles involving the Ottoman Empire
 Sick man of Europe
 Eastern Question

Notes

References

Further reading
 Odan, Serada. "Thread: List of Wars Involving the Ottoman Empire." Ummahcom Muslim Forum RSS. N.p., n.d. Web. 04 Mar. 2015.
 "List of Wars Involving the Ottoman Empire." List of Wars Involving the Ottoman Empire. N.p., n.d. Web. 04 Mar. 2015.

 
Ottoman Empire
Ottoman Empire military-related lists
Ottoman Empire-related lists